List of 2017 Women's March locations
 List of 2017 Women's March locations outside the United States
 List of 2018 Women's March locations
 List of 2019 Women's March locations
 List of 2020 Women's March locations
 List of 2020 Women's March locations (October)
 List of 2021 Women's March locations
 List of 2022 Women's March locations

Individual events 
 2017 Lincoln Nebraska Women's March
 Women's March on Portland (2017)
 Women's March on Seattle (2017)

Lists of Women's March locations